Manship Farmstead is a historic farmstead and national historic district located near Tatum, Marlboro County, South Carolina. The district encompasses seven contributing buildings, one contributing site, and one contributing object in an early 20th century agricultural complex.  They consist of the main house (1906), outbuildings (commissary/carriage house, warehouse, two barns, tobacco barn, tenant house, and well house), a farm bell, the Manship family cemetery, and associated historic rural landscape.

It was listed on the National Register of Historic Places in 1997.

References

Farms on the National Register of Historic Places in South Carolina
Historic districts on the National Register of Historic Places in South Carolina
Houses completed in 1906
National Register of Historic Places in Marlboro County, South Carolina
1906 establishments in South Carolina